Chigozie C. Asiabaka  (born September 29, 1953) is a Nigerian academic, who is the 6th substantive vice-chancellor of the Federal University of Technology Owerri (FUTO), in Imo State.

Early life and biography
Chigozie Asiabaka was born in Awo Idemili, Imo State. He attended the Government Sec School, Owerri, Imo State, where he received his Sec school leaving certificate, and earned his PhD in agricultural and education extension services from Louisiana State University, Baton Rouge in 1984.

Services

Chigozie Asiabaka started as a lecturer in FUTO where he lectured for eleven years from 1986 to 1997. He also served as the co-ordinator of Research & Training Centre in FUTO for five years from 1992 to 1997. He was the H.O.D and director of Centre for Continuing Education in FUTO, Imo State. The position he occupied for two years from 1992 to 1994 he served as the chairman for Committee of Deans in FUTO for three years from 2004 to 2007. He was also the chairman for Endowment Fund Committee from 2002 to 2004 in same institution and as a member of Senate Governing Council for two years from 2005 to 2007.

References

1953 births
Living people
Academic staff of the Federal University of Technology Owerri
Vice-Chancellors of Federal University of Technology Owerri